Eve Sussman is a British-born American artist of film, video, installation, sculpture, and photography. She was educated at Robert College of Istanbul, University of Canterbury, and Bennington College. She resides in Brooklyn, New York, where her company, the Rufus Corporation, is based. She visits cultural centers around the world where her exhibitions take place.

Work
Sussman's first solo show was at the Bronwyn Keenan Gallery in SoHo in 1997.

In 2003 Sussman began working in collaboration with The Rufus Corporation, an international ad hoc ensemble of performers, artists, and musicians. She produced the motion picture and video art pieces 89 Seconds at Alcázar (2004) and The Rape of the Sabine Women (2007). Sussman translates well known masterworks into her large scale re-enactments.

89 Seconds at Alcázar is a 10-minute, continuously flowing single take that meticulously creates the moments directly before and after the image portrayed by Diego Velázquez in Las Meninas (1656). It premiered at the 2004 Whitney Biennial.

Sussman's The Rape of the Sabine Women is a video-musical loosely based on the myth of the founding of Rome, inspired by the French neoclassical painter Jacques-Louis David's masterpiece, The Intervention of the Sabine Women (1794-1799). It was shot on location in Greece and Germany.

Sussman's 2011 film whiteonwhite:algorithmicnoir follows the observations and surveillance of a geophysicist software writer stuck in a futuristic city.

Yuri's Office, published in 2010, is a movie set built by Sussman in cooperation with The Rufus Corporation. The piece is a three-dimensional version of an original photograph taken by Sussman depicting the office of Yuri Gagarin.

Exhibitions

Sussman's work has been exhibited at the Whitney Museum of American Art and at institutions in Turkey, Austria, United Kingdom, Ireland, Germany, Italy, Spain, Croatia, France, Poland, and Canada.

whiteonwhite:algorithmicnoir and Yuri's Office were on display from April 24 - September 7, 2015 in the Smithsonian American Art Museum in Washington D.C., United States.

See also 
 Tableau vivant

See also
 Inside the Artist's Studio, Princeton Architectural Press, 2015.

References

External links 
 Interview with Eve Sussman at Artfacts.Net
 Still photos from 89 Seconds at Alcazar
 whiteonwhite - Six episodes of an algorithmic noir, commissioned by Triple Canopy (online magazine), as part of its Internet as Material Project

Robert College alumni
1961 births
Living people
American artists
British artists